Sour Sweet is a 1982 novel by Timothy Mo. Written as a 'sour sweet' comedy the story follows the tribulations of a Hong Kong Chinese immigrant and his initially reluctant wife as they attempt to make a home for themselves in 1960s London. It was awarded the Hawthornden Prize for 1982, and shortlisted for the Booker Prize for Fiction.

Film adaptation

The novel was filmed as Soursweet in 1988. Mike Newell directed. Novelist Ian McEwan wrote the script.

References

1982 British novels
Fiction set in the 1960s
British novels adapted into films
Hawthornden Prize-winning works
Novels set in London
André Deutsch books